One Piece is a Japanese manga franchise.

One Piece, OnePiece, or one-piece may also refer to:
 One Piece (TV series), a Japanese animated series based on the manga
 One Piece (2023 TV series), an upcoming Netflix live action series based on the manga
 OnePiece (music production team), a South Korean music production team
 One-piece swimsuit
 One piece, a modern carbon fibre ice hockey stick

See also 
 All in One (disambiguation)
 Onesie (disambiguation)
 Two-piece (disambiguation)
 Three-piece (disambiguation)